Nílton or Nilton may refer to:

Nílton (footballer, born December 1987) (born 1987), Brazilian footballer
Nílton (footballer, born April 1987) (born 1987), Brazilian footballer
Nilton (comedian), Portuguese comedian and judge on the Portuguese version of Thank God You're Here

Portuguese masculine given names